Þórdís Kolbrún Reykfjörð Gylfadóttir (born 4 November 1987) is an Icelandic politician and lawyer serving as the current Minister for Foreign Affairs of Iceland. She has also previously held the positions of Minister of Tourism, Industry and Innovation and Minister of Justice. She has also been a member of the Althing (Iceland's parliament) for the Northwest Constituency since 2016, as a representative of the Independence Party. At the age of 29, she became the youngest woman to become an Icelandic Minister. She has been the vice-chairman of the Independence Party since 2018.

References

External links 
 Biography of Þórdís Kolbrún R. Gylfadóttir on the parliament website (Icelandic)
 Official website

|-

1987 births
Living people
21st-century Icelandic politicians
Female defence ministers
Female foreign ministers
Female justice ministers
Foreign ministers of Iceland
Government ministers of Iceland
Icelandic women in politics
Independence Party (Iceland) politicians
Icelandic women lawyers
Members of the Althing
People from Akranes
Reykjavík University alumni
Women government ministers of Iceland